A foreign worker visa is an immigration document that allows a foreign national to temporarily live and work in a country. Ideally, such foreign nationals remedy a skill shortage in the host country, which gains support of business groups.

See also
Foreign worker visas of the United States:
E-3 visa
H-1B visa
L-1 visa

Visas
Immigration law
Employment of foreign-born